The 2016–17 season was the 118th season in the history of Leyton Orient Football Club, their 101st in the Football League, and the second consecutive season in Football League Two.

Transfers

In

Out

Loans in

Loans Out

Competitions

Pre-season friendlies

League Two

League table

Matches

FA Cup

EFL Cup

EFL Trophy

Player statistics
 

|-
! colspan="14" style="background:#dcdcdc; text-align:center"| Goalkeepers

|-
! colspan="14" style="background:#dcdcdc; text-align:center"| Defenders

|-
! colspan="14" style="background:#dcdcdc; text-align:center"| Midfielders

|-
! colspan="14" style="background:#dcdcdc; text-align:center"| Forwards

|-
! colspan="14" style="background:#dcdcdc; text-align:center"| Out on Loan

|-
! colspan="14" style="background:#dcdcdc; text-align:center"| Left During Season

Top scorers
Includes all competitive matches. The list is sorted by squad number when total goals are equal.

Last updated 6 May 2016.

Disciplinary record
Includes all competitive matches. The list is sorted by position, and then shirt number.

|-
|colspan=4|TOTALS
|72
|0
|3
|2
|0
|0
|1
|0
|0
|2
|0
|0
|77
|0
|3
|

|}

References

Leyton Orient F.C. seasons
Leyton Orient